Drozdowo  is a village in the administrative district of Gmina Piątnica, within Łomża County, Podlaskie Voivodeship, in north-eastern Poland. The village has a population of 690.

The first mentions of Drozdowo come from as far back as 1417. By the middle of the 19th century, the town and surrounding land belonged to the estates of the szlachta Lutosławski family. Starting from 1864, Drozdowo had a functional brewery, the product of which quickly became well known in the area, thanks to access to pristine water and expert workers. Drozdowo beer was awarded first prize at competitions in Warsaw in 1867 and Vienna in 1873, opening the markets for it both in the Polish Kingdom and abroad. It was later awarded first prize at similar competitions in Philadelphia in 1876 and Paris in 1878.

Drozdowo was on the fronts of World War I and II. Already after WW I the extent of damage was so big that neither the estates nor brewery ever regained their former grandeur. After the war, most of the inhabitants of Drozdowo resided to farming, and the last members of the Lutosławski family left the village in 1979.

People associated with Drozdowo 

 Witold Lutosławski (1913–1994), famous composer and orchestral conductor
 Marian Lutosławski (1871–1918), engineer, bridge builder and inventor
 Wincenty Lutosławski (1863–1954), philosopher and author
 Roman Dmowski

External links 

 Home page of the Drozdowo museum

Villages in Łomża County
Masovian Voivodeship (1526–1795)
Łomża Governorate
Białystok Voivodeship (1919–1939)
Warsaw Voivodeship (1919–1939)
Belastok Region